Ravenea julietiae is a species of flowering plant in the  Arecaceae family. It is a palm endemic to Madagascar. It is threatened by habitat loss, and there are perhaps 80 mature individuals remaining in the wild.

References

julietiae
Endemic flora of Madagascar
Endangered flora of Africa
Taxonomy articles created by Polbot
Taxa named by Henk Jaap Beentje